This is an index of articles relating to soil.

A
Acid sulfate soil
- Acrisol
- Active layer
- Agricultural soil science
- Akadama
- Albeluvisols
- Alfisols
- Alkali soil
- Andisols
- Angle of repose
- Antigo (soil)
- Anthrosol
- Aridisols
- Atriplex
- Australian Society of Soil Science Incorporated -

B
Baer's law
- Bama (soil)
- Barren vegetation
- Base-richness
- Bay mud
- Bearing capacity
- Bentonite
- Berkshire (soil)
- Bevameter
- Biochar
- Biogeology
- Blandford (soil)
- Blue goo
- Bog
- Brickearth
- Brown earth
- Brown podzolic

C
Calcareous grassland
- Calcareous
- Calciorthid
- Calcisols
- Cambisols
- Canada Land Inventory
- Capacitance probe
- Carbon cycle re-balancing
- Casa Grande (soil)
- Cation-exchange capacity 
- Cellular confinement
- Cecil (soil)
- Characterisation of pore space in soil
- Charlottetown (soil series)
- Chernozem
- Clay
- Claypan
- Cob (material)
- Cohesion (geology)
- Compressed earth block
- Consolidation (soil)
- Contour ploughing
- Critical state soil mechanics

D
Darcy (unit)
- Darcy's law
- Darcy–Weisbach equation
- Dark earth
- Dispersion (geology)
- Downer (soil)
- Downhill creep
- Drainage research
- Drilosphere
- Drucker–Prager yield criterion
- Drummer (soil)
- Dry quicksand
- Dryland salinity
- Duricrust
- Durisols
- Dynamic compaction

E
Ecological land classification
- Ecosystem ecology
- Edaphic
- Edaphology
- Effective stress
- Eluvium
- Entisol
- Environmental impact of irrigation
- Erosion
- European Soil Bureau Network
- European Soil Database
- Expansive clay

F
Factors affecting permeability of soils
- Fech fech
- Fen
- Ferrallitisation
- Fill dirt
- Flatwood
- Flownet
- Fractal in soil mechanics
- Frequency domain sensor
- Fresno scraper
- Frost heaving
- Frost line
- Fuller's earth

G
Gelisols
- Geosmin
- Geotechnical investigation
- Gleysol
- Gravitational erosion
- Groundwater-related subsidence
- Guelph soil
- Gypcrust
- Gypsisols

H
Hardpan
- Headland (agriculture)
- Hesco bastion
- Hilo (soil)
- History of soil science
- Histosol
- Houdek (soil)
- Hume (soil)
- Humin
- Humus
- Hydraulic conductivity
- Hydric soil
- Hydro axe mulching
- Hydrological transport model
- Hydropedology
- Hydrophobic soil

I
Immobilization (soil science)
- Inceptisols
- Infiltration capacity
- International Humic Substances Society
- International Soil Reference and Information Centre
- International Union of Soil Sciences

J
Jory (soil)

K
Kalkaska sand
- Kerogen

L
Lahar
- Laimosphere
- Land improvement
- Lateral earth pressure
- Leaching (agriculture)
- Leaching (pedology)
- Leaching model (soil)
- Leptosols
- Lessivage
- Liming (soil)
- Linear aeration
- Lixisols
- Loam
- Loess
- Lunar soil

M
Martian soil
- Miami (soil)
- Multi-Scale Soil Information Systems
- Mineralization (soil science)
- Mollisols
- Mud
- Multiscale European Soil Information System
- Muskeg
- Myakka (soil)

N
Narragansett (soil)
- Natchez silt loam
- National Society of Consulting Soil Scientists
- Natural organic matter
- Newmark's influence chart
- No till method

O
On-Grade Mat Foundation for Expansive Soils
- OPAL Soil Centre
- Orovada (soil)
- Orthent
- Overburden pressure
- Oxisol

P
Paleosol
- Particle size (grain size)
- Paxton (soil)
- Peat
- Pedalfer
- Pedocal
- Pedodiversity
- Pedology
- Permeability (earth sciences)
- Petrichor
- Plaggen soil
- Plainfield (soil)
- Planosol
- Plough pan
- Podzol
- Pore water pressure
- Porosity
- Port Silt Loam
- Prime farmland
- Psamment
- Pygmy forest

Q
Quick clay
- Quicksand

R
Rankers
- Red Mediterranean soil
- Regosols
- Rendzina
- Residual Sodium Carbonate Index
- Reynolds' dilatancy
- Rill
- Rock flour

S
SahysMod
- Saline seep
- Salinity in Australia
- Salt marsh
- Salting the earth
- SaltMod
- San Joaquin (soil)
- Sand
- Sand boil
- Sandbag
- Scobey (soil)
- Seitz (soil)
- Serpentine soil
- Shear strength (soil)
- Shear strength test
- Shrub swamp
- Silt
- Slope stability
- Slump
- Sodium adsorption ratio
- Soil
- Soil acidification
- Soil amendment
- Soil and water assessment tool
- Soil Association
- Soil biodiversity
- Soil biology
- Soil carbon
- Soil cement
- Soil chemistry
- Soil classification
- Soil compaction
- Soil conditioner
- Soil conservation
- Soil Conservation and Domestic Allotment Act
- Soil Conservation and Domestic Allotment Act of 1936
- Soil contamination
- Soil crust
- Soil depletion
- Soil ecology
- Soil erosion
- Soil fertility
- Soil food web
- Soil functions
- Soil gradation
- Soil guideline value
- Soil health
- Soil horizon
- Soil inoculant
- Soil life
- Soil liquefaction
- Soil management 
- Soil mechanics
- Soil moisture
- Soil moisture sensors
- Soil nailing
- Soil organic matter
- Soil pH
- Soil physics
- Soil policy (Victoria, Australia)
- Soil profile
- Soil resilience
- Soil respiration
- Soil salinity
- Soil salinity control
- Soil science
- Soil Science Society of America
- Soil series
- Soil solarization
- Soil steam sterilization
- Soil structure
- Soil survey
- Soil test
- Soil texture
- Soil type
- Soil water (retention)
- Soils retrogression and degradation
- Solonchak
- Solonetz
- Specific storage
- Specific weight
- Spodic soils
- Stagnosol
- Strip farming
- Stuttgart (soil)
- Subaqueous soil
- Subsidence
- Subsoil

T
Talik
- Tanana (soil)
- Technosols
- Tepetate
- Terrace (agriculture)
- Terracette
- Terramechanics
- Terra preta
- Terra rosa (soil)
- Terzaghi's Principle
- Thaw depth
- Thixotropy
- Threebear (soil)
- Throughflow
- Tifton (soil)
- Tillage
- Topsoil
- Tropical peat

U
Umbric horizon
- Ultisols
- Umbrisols
- Unified Soil Classification System
- USDA soil taxonomy
- Ustochrept

V
Vegetation and slope stability
- Vertisol
- Vibro stone column
- Void ratio

W
Water content
- Weathering
- Windsor (soil)
- World Congress of Soil Science

Y
Yedoma

See also
 List of state soil science associations
 List of state soil science licensing boards
 List of U.S. state soils
 List of bogs
 List of vineyard soil types

Index
 

Soil
Soil
Soil science-related lists